I Album: ID (stylized as I album -iD-) is the ninth studio album of the Japanese duo KinKi Kids. It was released on December 13, 2006. The album was certified platinum by the RIAJ for 250,000 copies shipped to stores in Japan.

Track listing

References

 I Album: ID . Johnny's net. Retrieved November 1, 2009.

External links
 Official KinKi Kids website

2006 albums
KinKi Kids albums